Arthur Clifford Darch  (October 15, 1931 – April 2, 2013) was a Canadian football player who played for the Hamilton Tiger-Cats and Toronto Argonauts. He won the Grey Cup with Hamilton in 1953. He previously played football at Stamford Collegiate in his hometown of Niagara. After his football career he worked in the insurance industry and with CBC Television. He is a member of the Niagara Falls Sports Wall of Fame. Darch died in 2013 in Hamilton.

References

1931 births
2013 deaths
Hamilton Tiger-Cats players
Players of Canadian football from Ontario
Sportspeople from Niagara Falls, Ontario
Toronto Argonauts players